Andrés Avelino Acosta Parra (10 November 1917 – August 2008) was a Paraguayan Association football player that also defended his country during the Chaco War.

As a footballer, Acosta played for Club Oriental, Cerro Porteño, Atlántida SC and most importantly for Atlético Corrales where he was part of the longest tour by a Paraguay national team around Latin American (it lasted 1 year and 15 days). Acosta also played in several occasions for the Paraguay national football team, including the 1942 Copa America. He played as a defender.

References

2008 deaths
Paraguayan footballers
Cerro Porteño players
Paraguay international footballers
Paraguayan soldiers
1917 births
Association football defenders
Atlántida Sport Club players